The Hohola Mosque is a mosque in Port Moresby, National Capital District, Papua New Guinea. It is the first mosque in the country.

History
The construction of the mosque originated in 2001 when the government donated a piece of land to a local Islamic society. The building construction started in 2004 and was completed in 2007. It then became the first mosque established in the country. Much of the mosque funding came from Malaysia and Saudi Arabia.

See also
 Islam in Papua New Guinea

References

2007 establishments in Papua New Guinea
Buildings and structures in Port Moresby
Islam in Papua New Guinea
Mosques completed in 2007